The Australian Grape and Wine Authority is responsible for research, development and extension of the wine industry in Australia, including protecting the reputation of Australian wine. It was created in 2014 by merging Wine Australia and the Grape and Wine Research and Development Corporation.

The Australian Grape and Wine Authority includes a regulatory body that ensures wine production complies with the Food Standards Code and ensures that information on labels of Australian wine is accurate, including geographic indicators.

References

Commonwealth Government agencies of Australia
Wine industry organizations
Australian distilled drinks
Australian wine
Regulatory authorities of Australia